Vladimir Vavilov may refer to:
 Vladimir Vavilov (composer) (1925–1973), Russian guitarist and composer
 Vladimir Vavilov (football) (b. 1988), Russian footballer